Anisoscelis marginellus is a species of leaf-footed bug in the family Coreidae. It was first described by William Dallas in 1852 and it has been recorded in Brazil and Argentina. It was previously considered a subspecies of A. foliaceus

References 

Insects described in 1852
marginellus